"I'm Still Here" is a song by Australian singer-songwriter Sia. It was released as a standalone single on 12 October 2018 by Monkey Puzzle and Atlantic Records in connection with Sia's collaboration with French shoe brand Repetto. It is featured as a bonus track on the Japanese edition of Sia's ninth studio album, Music – Songs from and Inspired by the Motion Picture.

Background and release 
In 2018, Sia joined forces with Labrinth and Diplo to form pop supergroup LSD. Their debut single, "Genius" was released on 3 May 2018, followed by "Audio" a week later, and "Thunderclouds" in August 2018. Their debut album was originally slated for a November 2018 release, but was eventually released in April 2019. 2018 also saw Sia collaborate with Dolly Parton and David Guetta on the singles "Here I Am" (from the [[Dumplin' (soundtrack)|Dumplin''' soundtrack]]) and "Flames", respectively.

On 28 September 2018, Sia announced the release of a collection of shoes, designed by her, in collaboration with French shoe company Repetto. On 9 October, Sia teased the release of a new song titled "I'm Still Here", and it was released on 12 October, in connection with the Repetto collaboration. The shoe line was made available for purchase in February 2019.

"I'm Still Here" was used in a public service announcement video from Everytown for Gun Safety, standing up against gun violence in the United States, and was also featured in the HBO documentary At the Heart of Gold: Inside the USA Gymnastics Scandal''.

Composition 
"I'm Still Here" is an "inspirational", midtempo ballad which features Sia's "powerful" vocals. Lyrically, it is about perseverance and Sia's battles with the past. At a length of 4 minutes and 1 second, the song was written by Sia and frequent collaborator Jesse Shatkin in the key of A major, and produced solely by Shatkin. Sia's vocals in the song span from F♯3 to A4.

Credits and personnel 
Credits adapted from Tidal.

 Sia Furler – writer, vocals, bells
 Jesse Shatkin – writer, producer, bass, drum programmer, drums, piano, string arranger, synthesizer, engineer
 Samuel Dent – string arranger, additional engineer
 Serban Ghenea – mixer
 John Hanes – mixing engineer

Charts

Release history

Notes

References 

2010s ballads
2018 singles
2018 songs
Atlantic Records singles
Sia (musician) songs
Songs written by Jesse Shatkin
Songs written by Sia (musician)